The Sporck Battalion (German: Die Sporck'schen Jäger) is a 1927 German silent war film directed by Holger-Madsen and starring Otto Gebühr, Walter Rilla and Grete Mosheim. Hans Albers is sometimes added in some cast lists, but his performance is unconfirmed. It was shot at the Weissensee Studios in Berlin. The film's sets were designed by the art director Max Knaake. It was remade as a sound film of the same title in 1934.

Cast
 Otto Gebühr as Hauptmann Rabenhainer 
 Walter Rilla as Leutnant von Naugard 
 Albert Steinrück as Forstmeister von Rüdiger 
 Grete Mosheim as Elisabeth, seine Tochter 
 Anton Pointner as Oberleutnant von Valenberg 
 Hedwig Wangel as Witwe Retelsdorf 
 Elizza La Porta as Mike - ihre Tochter 
 Fritz Alberti as Oberstleutnant Brinkmann 
 Elsa Wagner as Trine - Wirtschafterin bei v. Rüdiger 
 Max Maximilian as Jochen - Forstgehilfe

References

Bibliography
 Bock, Hans-Michael & Bergfelder, Tim. The Concise CineGraph. Encyclopedia of German Cinema. Berghahn Books, 2009.

External links

1927 films
1927 war films
German war films
Films of the Weimar Republic
Films directed by Holger-Madsen
German silent feature films
Films based on German novels
German black-and-white films
Films set in Prussia
National Film films
Silent war films
1920s German films
Films shot at Weissensee Studios
1920s German-language films